The 2020 Ole Miss Rebels baseball team represented the University of Mississippi in the 2020 NCAA Division I baseball season. The Rebels played their home games at Swayze Field.

The final game played by the Rebels was on March 11 against Louisiana–Monroe. The season was suspended following that game due to the COVID-19 pandemic in the United States.

Previous season

The Rebels finished 41–27 overall, and 16–14 in the conference. The Rebels won the Oxford Regional in the 2019 NCAA Division I baseball tournament before losing in the Fayetteville Super Regional to Arkansas.

2019 MLB draft

The Rebels had eight players and four signees selected in the 2019 MLB draft.

Players in bold are signees drafted from high school that will attend Ole Miss.

Roster

Schedule and results

Schedule Source:
*Rankings are based on the team's current ranking in the D1Baseball poll.

Awards and honors

Regular season awards

February

Louisville weekend series

Alcorn State midweek

Xavier weekend series

Southern Miss midweek

Keith LeClair Classic

March

Keith LeClair Classic

Memphis midweek

Princeton weekend series

March 10–11 midweek

References

Ole Miss
Ole Miss Rebels baseball seasons
Ole Miss Rebels baseball